The A. J. Stephens House, also known as the Carpenter House and the Lucas County Historical Society Museum, is a historic building located in Chariton, Iowa, United States. The two-story concrete block structure was built by Stephens as his family's home in 1908.  He was a local contractor and the house was a showcase for masonry products and his skill in using them.  The house is a larger version of the American Foursquare.  On the front is a two-story Neoclassical style porch.  The Lucas County Historical Society bought the house in 1966 for use as a museum.  The house was listed on the National Register of Historic Places in 1987.

References

Houses completed in 1908
Chariton, Iowa
Historic house museums in Iowa
Museums in Lucas County, Iowa
National Register of Historic Places in Lucas County, Iowa
Houses on the National Register of Historic Places in Iowa
1908 establishments in Iowa